Nyers is a Hungarian surname, meaning "raw". Notable people with the surname include:

 Boglárka Dallos-Nyers (born 1997), Hungarian pop singer, also known as Bogi 
 Ferenc Nyers (born 1927), French football player
 István Nyers (1924 – 2005), Hungarian football player
 Rezső Nyers (1923 - 2018), Hungarian economist and politician

Hungarian-language surnames